Harry Washington Fritts Jr. (4 October 1921, Rockwood, Tennessee – 22 April 2011, Northport, New York) was an American physician, professor of medicine, and the founding chair of the Department of Medicine of the Stony Brook University School of Medicine.

Biography
Born in a coal mining town in eastern Tennessee, Fritts attended Vanderbilt University and then transferred to the Massachusetts Institute of Technology, where he graduated with a bachelor's degree in electrical engineering.

After leaving the U.S. Navy in 1946, he became a medical student and graduated in 1951 with an M.D. from the Boston University School of Medicine. After completing his internship and residency in Boston, he became a research fellow in the Cardio-Pulmonary Laboratory at Manhattan's Bellevue Hospital. There he was supervised and mentored by André Cournand and Dickinson W. Richards. When Cournand retired in 1964, Fritts became his successor as the laboratory director specializing in cardio-pulmonary physiology. When Bellevue's Cardio-Pulmonary Laboratory closed in 1968, the Laboratory's personnel moved to the Columbia Presbyterian Medical Center and Fritts was appointed the Dickson W. Richards Professor of Medicine at the Columbia University College of Physicians and Surgeons. He retained that professorship until he became in April 1973 the founding chair of the medical department of Stony Brook University School of Medicine, which was founded in 1971. At that time, there were 48 students enrolled in two classes (Class of 1974 and Class of 1975). At the Stony Brook University School of Medicine (on Long Island), he was the Edmund D. Pellegrino Professor of Medicine, as well as the chair of the medical department, from 1973 until 1987, when he retired.

From 1958 to 1973 Fritts was the author or co-author of approximately 30 scientific papers. He was a Guggenheim Fellow for the academic year 1959–1960. In 1997 the Johns Hopkins University Press published his book On Leading a Clinical Department: A Guide for Physicians.

He was predeceased by his wife Helen (1923–2010). Upon his death he was survived by three children and five grandchildren.

Selected publications

References

1921 births
2011 deaths
20th-century American physicians
21st-century American physicians
American physiologists
American pulmonologists
United States Navy personnel of World War II
MIT School of Engineering alumni
Boston University School of Medicine alumni
Columbia University faculty
Stony Brook University faculty
People from Roane County, Tennessee
Vanderbilt University alumni